Wilson-Courtney House, also known as the Courtney House, is a historic home located at Danville, Hendricks County, Indiana.  It was built between 1848 and 1850, and is a -story frame dwelling with a one-story rear ell and Greek Revival style design elements.  Also on the property is a contributing smokehouse.

It was added to the National Register of Historic Places in 1984.

References

Houses on the National Register of Historic Places in Indiana
Greek Revival houses in Indiana
Houses completed in 1850
National Register of Historic Places in Hendricks County, Indiana
Buildings and structures in Hendricks County, Indiana